The Suriname women's national football team is the national women's football team of Suriname and is overseen by the Surinaamse Voetbal Bond.

Player's strike
Hours before their final qualifying game versus Antigua & Barbuda, during the 2022 CONCACAF W Championship Qualifying, the entire team released a statement announcing their collective resignation. The team stated that barbaric circumstances and inequal treatment proved to be the final straw. Players demanded that the entire SVB board would step down, or else, all call-ups to the national team will be rejected. As of April 13, 2022, the Surinamese FA haven't released a statement following this decision.

Results and fixtures

The following is a list of match results in the last 12 months, as well as any future matches that have been scheduled.

Legend

2022

Players

Current squad

Recent call-ups
The following players have also been called up to the Suriname squad within the last twelve months.

Competitive record

FIFA Women's World Cup

*Draws include knockout matches decided on penalty kicks.

Olympic Games

*Draws include knockout matches decided on penalty kicks.

CONCACAF W Championship

*Draws include knockout matches decided on penalty kicks.

Pan American Games

*Draws include knockout matches decided on penalty kicks.

Central American and Caribbean Games

*Draws include knockout matches decided on penalty kicks.

References

External links
Official website
FIFA Profile

women
South American women's national association football teams
Caribbean women's national association football teams
Women's sport in Suriname